The World of Outlaws Case Construction Late Model Series is a Dirt Super Late Model touring series currently owned  by World Racing Group, and is sanctioned by the World of Outlaws & DIRTcar. The series competes on dirt ovals across the United States, primarily throughout the east coast & the midwest. The series has also raced in Canada in previous years. The series is currently sponsored by Case Construction Equipment.

The cars feature a purpose-built chassis design specifically for dirt late model racing. With many chassis builders within the sport, chassis design and components are always employing new innovation and technology. The cars are powered by aluminum-head V8 engines (usually ranging between 400c.i. & 430c.i.) that produce over 800 horsepower.

Past champions 

 2021 – Brandon Sheppard
 2020 – Brandon Sheppard
 2019 – Brandon Sheppard
 2018 – Mike Marlar
 2017 – Brandon Sheppard
 2016 – Josh Richards
 2015 – Shane Clanton
 2014 – Darrell Lanigan
 2013 – Josh Richards
 2012 – Darrell Lanigan
 2011 – Rick Eckert
 2010 – Josh Richards
 2009 – Josh Richards
 2008 – Darrell Lanigan
 2007 – Steve Francis
 2006 – Tim McCreadie
 2005 – Billy Moyer
 2004 – Scott Bloomquist
 1989 – Billy Moyer
 1988 – Billy Moyer

Images

External links
Official Series Website

References

Stock car racing series in the United States
Dirt track racing in the United States